(died 1609) was a Hadhrami religious leader who lived in the 16th century and a descendant of Abu Bakr al-ʿAydarūs, a prominent saint who started the al-ʿAydarūs branch of the Bā ʿAlawiyyah clan.

Abdullah was among the earliest Hadhrami Arab settlers in Aceh, and, like many of his kinsmen who came after, he served as the Naqib "religious leader" of Aceh. Sultan Alauddin Mansur Syah of the Aceh Sultanate (reigned 1577–1585) persuaded ʿAbdullah to marry his daughter, and his son Zayn al-ʿAbidin was born out of this union. In his later years, he led his life in a local village, Kampung Pasir Putih, where he died of old age.

ʿAbdullāh's son Zayn al-ʿAbidin also became a religious leader and migrated to Johor, where he married Tun Kaishi, the daughter of Tun Jenal, the Bendahara of Sekudai and took up the Malay name of "Tun Dagang" while staying with the Bendahara's family.

Ancestry

See also
Ali al-Uraidhi ibn Ja'far al-Sadiq

Notes

References

 Ahlul-bait (keluarga) Rasulullah SAW & Raja-Raja Melayu, by Muzaffar Dato' Hj Mohamad, Tun Suzana Tun Haji Othman, published by Al-Wasilah Enterprise, 2001, 
 Bendaharas and Temenggungs, Journal of Malayan Branch of Royal Asiatic Society, Vol X part I, 1932, Richard Olaf Winstedt
 Derita Putri-putri Nabi: Studi historis Kafa'ah Syarifah, by M. Hasyim Assagaf, published by Remaja Rosdakarya, 2000, 
 Institusi Bendahara: Permata Melayu yang Hilang: Dinasti Bendahara Johor-Pahang, by Suzana Tun Hj. Othman, published by Pustaka BSM Enterprise, 2002, 
 Journal of the Malaysian Branch of the Royal Asiatic Society, by Royal Asiatic Society of Great Britain and Ireland Malaysian Branch, Singapore, 1932
 Nasihat-Nasihat Semasa Kepegawaiannya Kepada Pemerintah Hindia Belanda, 1889–1936, by Christiaan Snouck Hurgronje, E. Gobée, C. Adriaanse, published by INIS, 1990, 
 Malaysia Kita, by Institut Tadbiran Awam Negara (Malaysia), published by Institut Tadbiran Awam Negara, 1991, 
 Sufis and Scholars of the Sea: Family Networks in East Africa, 1860-1925, Anne K. Bang, Routledge, 2003, 
 The Acehnese Vol. I, by Christiaan Snouck Hurgronje, published by E.J. Brill, 1906
 The Sufi Orders in Islam, by J. Spencer Trimingham, John O. Voll, published by Oxford University Press, 1998 

1609 deaths
A
Yemeni Sufi religious leaders
History of Islam in Indonesia
Yemeni emigrants to Indonesia
Hadhrami people
Year of birth unknown
Indonesian Sufi religious leaders